Cosmetidae is a family of harvestmen in the suborder Laniatores. With over 700 species, it is one of the largest families in Opiliones. They are distributed from Argentina to the southern USA with the highest diversity in northern South America, Central America and Mexico. This Nearctic-Neotropical family comprises Opiliones with elaborate white/yellow/green/orange/red stripes and spots on the dorsal scutum and peculiar pedipalps strongly compressed and applied on the chelicerae.

Name
The family name is derived from the type genus Cosmetus, which is from the Greek kosmetós 'ornate'.

Differential external anatomy
 Eye mound is very low, saddle shaped, placed on middle of cephalothorax, each ocular globe bears a crest of small pointed tubercles or is smooth. Ozopores slit-like, one opening partially covered by tubercle of coxa II. Scutal areas are often indistinct; sometimes the sulci can be distinguished by color pattern or absence of tubercles; scutum and tergites are typically weakly armed.
 Genitalia. Penis are standard gonyleptoid and very conservative, with rectangular ventral plate, puffed sac-glans, well-developed thumb-like dorsal process. 
See more details in Kury & Pinto-da-Rocha (2007).

Distribution
The Cosmetidae are endemic of the New World. The peak of their diversity is in northern South America, Central America, and Mexico, where maybe one third to half of species of Opiliones are represented by this single family; they are numerous in Amazonian and Andean realms and also in the Caribbean. They are absent in Chile. They also reach southwards as far as Argentina and even southern Brazil (genus Metalibitia). There are a few species in the Brazilian Atlantic Forest, mostly belonging to the genus Metavononoides. A few species now in Vonones reach far northwards into the USA, where they occur in many of the southern states.

Subtaxa
As of 2006, there are 125 genera and 712 species described. Most species belong to Cynorta (153 spp), Paecilaema (102 spp), Flirtea and Erginulus (30 spp each). However, there is no reason to believe most of genera of cosmetids are natural groups, except for a few like Metavononoides, Cosmetus (Kury, 2003) and Roquettea (Ferreira & Kury 2010) . Attempts to organize the family in supra-specific units are hindered by the poorly resolved basic taxonomy. 

The family is currently divided into two subfamilies: Cosmetinae and Discosomaticinae.

Relationships
Cosmetidae is the sister-group of Gonyleptidae and both are related to the Stygnidae and Cranaidae (Kury, 1992).

References

  (2010). A Review of Roquettea, with Description of Three New Brazilian Species and Notes on Gryne (Opiliones,Cosmetidae, Discosomaticinae). Zoological Sciences,, 27: 697 - 708.
  (2003). Annotated catalogue of the Laniatores of the New World (Arachnida, Opiliones). Revista Ibérica de Aracnología, vol. especial monográfico, 1: 1-337.
  (2007). Cosmetidae Koch, 1839. pp 182–185. In: Pinto-da-Rocha, R., G. Machado & G. Giribet (eds.). Harvestmen: the biology of the Opiliones. Harvard University Press, Cambridge and London. x + 597 pages.

 
Harvestman families